The 1964–65 Yugoslav First League had an odd number of teams because FK Vardar was allowed to compete in the top league despite getting relegated the previous season. The state and FA authorities made this decision due to the major earthquake (6.1 Richter scale) that hit Skopje on 26 July 1963. The thinking was that having a team in top-flight would boost the citizens' morale.

After week 8 of fixtures on 13 September 1964, the league went on an almost two-month break in order to accommodate the October 1964 Yugoslav Olympic national team's participation at the 1964 Tokyo Olympics where the team consisting entirely of players from the Yugoslav First League made it out of its round-robin group but lost in the quarterfinals to West Germany. The season resumed on 8 November 1964.

Teams
At the end of the previous season only FK Novi Sad was relegated - in spite of finishing last, FK Vardar was allowed to stay in top flight due to the 1963 Skopje earthquake. Since NK Zagreb and Sutjeska Nikšić were promoted from Yugoslav Second League, the league was contested by 15 teams.

League table

Results

Winning squad
Champions:
 FK Partizan (Coach: Aleksandar Atanacković)
player (league matches/league goals)
Vladica Kovačević (28/14)
Josip Pirmajer (27/7)
Ljubomir Mihajlović (26/0)
Milan Galić (24/15)
Ivan Ćurković (23/0) (goalkeeper)
Mustafa Hasanagić (20/13)
Radoslav Bečejac (20/2)
Jovan Miladinović (19/0)
Joakim Vislavski (18/5)
Fahrudin Jusufi (18/0)
Branko Rašović (17/0)
Velibor Vasović (15/0)
Velimir Sombolac (14/0)
Milan Damjanović (11/0)
Milan Vukelić (10/0)
Lazar Radović (8/0)
Bora Milutinović (6/0)
Mane Bajić (5/1)
Miodrag Petrović (5/1)
Milutin Šoškić (4/0) (goalkeeper)
Branislav Mihajlović (2/0)
Jovan Ćurčić (1/0) (goalkeeper)
Vojislav Simeunović (1/0)

Top scorers

See also
1964–65 Yugoslav Second League
1964–65 Yugoslav Cup

External links
Yugoslavia Domestic Football Full Tables

Yugoslav First League seasons
Yugo
1964–65 in Yugoslav football